Augustus Arthur Vansittart (24 July 1824 – 17 April 1882) was an English scholar.

Life
He was the son of George Henry Vansittart of Bisham Abbey—his father predeceased his birth—and his widow Anna Maria, daughter and coheiress of Thomas Copson of Sheppey Hall, Leicestershire.  He was educated at Eton College and Trinity College, Cambridge, where he became a fellow.

Vansittart was noted for collation of the various readings of the New Testament, and founded the Sedgwick Prize, a geology prize for Cambridge Fellows. He built "Pinehurst House", on Grange Road, Cambridge. He is buried in the Ascension Parish Burial Ground, Cambridge.

Family
Vansittart married, on 26 May 1857, Rachel Fanny Anne Irby, eldest daughter of George Ives, 4th Baron Boston.

References

1824 births
1882 deaths
Fellows of Trinity College, Cambridge
Alumni of Trinity College, Cambridge
People educated at Eton College
Members of Lincoln's Inn
British barristers